Burgfestspiele Rötteln  is an open-air theatre in Lörrach (Baden-Württemberg, Germany) performing on Rötteln castle.

Theatres in Baden-Württemberg